The wainstones may mean

 rocks at Hasty Bank in the Cleveland Hills
 rocks on the Bleaklow plateau in Derbyshire